Saleem Bakkoush (Arabic: سليم البكوش) is a popular Tunisian singer.

In 2010, he was forced to cancel an appearance at the Carthage Festival concert after protests following the posting of footage showing him performing at the El Ghriba synagogue, the country's oldest Jewish house of worship.

See also
Antisemitism

References

21st-century Tunisian male singers
Living people
Year of birth missing (living people)